Adriana Muñoz Premier (born 16 March 1982) is a Cuban middle-distance runner who specialized in the 800 and 1500 metres.

At the Pan American Games she won gold medals in both events, the latter in a career best time of 4:09.57 minutes. She also competed in 800 metres at the 2003 World Championships, but without reaching the final.

Personal bests
Her personal best 800 metres time as 2:00.10 minutes, achieved in June 2004 in Havana.

400 m: 54.78 s –  La Habana, 29 June 2012
800 m: 2:00.10 min –  La Habana, 25 June 2004
1000 m: 2:37.28 min –  La Habana, 23 September 2011
1500 m: 4:09.57 min NR –  Santo Domingo, 7 August 2003
3000 m: 9:34.64 min –  San Fernando, 6 June 2010

Competition record

Notes

References

External links
 
 
 Ecured biography 

 

1982 births
Living people
Cuban female middle-distance runners
Athletes (track and field) at the 2003 Pan American Games
Athletes (track and field) at the 2011 Pan American Games
Athletes (track and field) at the 2015 Pan American Games
Pan American Games gold medalists for Cuba
Pan American Games medalists in athletics (track and field)
Central American and Caribbean Games bronze medalists for Cuba
Competitors at the 2014 Central American and Caribbean Games
Central American and Caribbean Games medalists in athletics
Medalists at the 2003 Pan American Games
Medalists at the 2011 Pan American Games